Line SFM4 is part of the Turin Metropolitan Railway Service. It links Turin to Alba.

References

Turin Metropolitan Railway Service